Lena "Kuraine" Raine (born February 29, 1984), also known as Lena Chappelle, is an American-Canadian composer, producer, and video game developer. Raine is best known for her work on the soundtracks of Celeste, Minecraft and Guild Wars 2. She has composed music for various other video games, including Deltarune and Chicory: A Colorful Tale.

Early life 
Raine had an early exposure to music due to participation in choir at a young age. Her father was also a violinist. Through a Sonic the Hedgehog fan community she was introduced to MIDI arrangement, first making MIDI versions of songs she knew and then making original music. She later attended Cornish College of the Arts for a degree in music composition.

Career 
Raine is best known for her work on the soundtracks of Celeste and Guild Wars 2. She worked on Guild Wars 2 at ArenaNet for six years, initially as a Game Designer before composing soundtracks for the game. At ArenaNet, she and Maclaine Diemer were in-house composers of the music for the game's 2015 expansion, Guild Wars 2: Heart of Thorns. She left ArenaNet in 2016.

In 2018, Raine released the text adventure ESC on itch.io. Raine was the developer and composer for ESC, with visuals created by Dataerase. In 2019, she released her debut album, Oneknowing. She composed music for Minecraft, creating four new pieces of music which were included in the 1.16 "Nether Update" in 2020. A year later, she returned to Minecraft, composing six new tracks for the 1.18 "Caves & Cliffs: Part II" update, alongside fellow video game composer Kumi Tanioka. Raine created the soundtrack for the adventure RPG Chicory: A Colorful Tale, and assisted with the soundtrack for the second chapter of Deltarune, both released in 2021.

Personal life 
Raine is transgender.

Awards 
Raine was nominated for a BAFTA (British Academy of Film and Television Arts) and won American Society of Composers, Authors and Publishers (ASCAP) Video Game Score of the Year in 2019. Her soundtrack for Celeste was also nominated for Best Score/Music at The Game Awards 2018.

Discography

Albums and singles

Soundtracks

Games

References

External links 

 

1984 births
American women composers
Living people
Video game composers
Transgender women musicians
American LGBT musicians
Transgender composers
Indie video game developers
Canadian LGBT musicians
Canadian women composers
21st-century American composers
21st-century American women
21st-century Canadian women
21st-century Canadian composers
Canadian women in electronic music
21st-century Canadian LGBT people